Ben Balter is a United States-based lawyer who works for GitHub as their "evangelist" to government agencies.

Balter has said that he works in a field where demand for data and access to repositories is sharply increasing in all sectors.

In 2012 Balter was a "Presidential Innovation Fellow" overseen by Todd Park.

In March 2013 Balter began working for GitHub.

References

External links
video interview by FedScoop
text interview with Fierce Government IT

Businesspeople in information technology
Living people
Year of birth missing (living people)